Rev. Samuel Austin Moffett (1864–1939,) was one of the early American Presbyterian missionaries to Korea. He studied at Hanover College, Indiana, and in 1888 at McCormick Theological Seminary in Chicago. In 1889, he was appointed a missionary to Korea by the Presbyterian Church and arrived at Seoul. He moved to Pyongyang to focus on the ministry in the northern part of Korean peninsula. In 1901 he began a theological class with two students meeting in his home. Later, the institution founded by Moffett split, and became the Presbyterian University and Theological Seminary in Seoul, and the Presbyterian Theological Seminary in Pyongyang. Prior to the split, Moffett served as the president for 17 years and as a member of its faculty until 1935. He served for 46 years before being forced out by the Japanese occupiers who considered him as a harmful influence against their colonization policy. He returned to the United States in 1936 and died in 1939 at his home in Monrovia, California.

References

1864 births
1939 deaths
McCormick Theological Seminary alumni
Hanover College alumni
American Presbyterian missionaries
Presbyterian missionaries in Korea
People from Pyongyang
American expatriates in Korea